Dziewięć Włók may refer to the following places in Poland:

Dziewięć Włók, Gdańsk County
Dziewięć Włók, Sztum County